"The Road Not Taken" is a narrative poem by Robert Frost, first published in the August 1915 issue of The Atlantic Monthly, and later published as the first poem in the collection Mountain Interval of 1916. Its central theme is the divergence of paths, both literally and figuratively, although its interpretation is noted for being complex and potentially divergent.

The first 1915 publication differs from the 1916 republication in Mountain Interval: In line 13, "marked" is replaced by "kept" and a dash replaces a comma in line 18.

Background
Frost spent the years 1912 to 1915 in England, where among his acquaintances was the writer Edward Thomas. Thomas and Frost became close friends and took many walks together. One day, as they were walking together, they came across two roads. Thomas was indecisive about which road to take, and in retrospect often lamented that they should have taken the other one. After Frost returned to New Hampshire in 1915, he sent Thomas an advance copy of "The Road Not Taken". Thomas took the poem seriously and personally, and it may have been significant in Thomas' decision to enlist in World War I. Thomas was killed two years later in the Battle of Arras.

Characteristics

Structure 
The poem consists of four stanzas of five lines each. With the rhyme scheme as 'ABAAB', the first line rhymes with the third and fourth, and the second line rhymes with the fifth. The meter is basically iambic tetrameter, with each line having four two-syllable feet, though in almost every line, in different positions, an iamb is replaced with an anapest.

Rhythm 

"The Road Not Taken" reads conversationally, beginning as a kind of photographic depiction of a quiet moment in yellow woods. The variation of its rhythm gives naturalness, a feeling of thought occurring spontaneously, affecting the reader's sense of expectation. In one of the few lines containing strictly iambs, the more regular rhythm supports the idea of a turning towards an acceptance of a kind of reality: "Though as for that the passing there … " In the final line, the way the rhyme and rhythm work together is significantly different, and catches the reader off guard.

Analysis 
"The Road Not Taken" is one of Frost's most popular works.  Yet, it is a frequently misunderstood poem, often read simply as a poem that champions the idea of "following your own path".  Actually, it expresses some irony regarding such an idea.  A critique in The Paris Review by David Orr described the misunderstanding this way:

<blockquote>"The poem’s speaker tells us he 'shall be telling,' at some point in the future, of how he took the road less traveled…yet he has already admitted that the two paths 'equally lay / In leaves' and 'the passing there / Had worn them really about the same.' So the road he will later call less traveled is actually the road equally traveled. The two roads are interchangeable.'''' </blockquote>

Frost himself wrote the poem as a joke for his friend Edward Thomas, who was often indecisive about which route to take when the two went walking. A New York Times book review on Brian Hall's 2008 biography Fall of Frost'' states: "Whichever way they go, they're sure to miss something good on the other path." Regarding the "sigh" that is mentioned in the last stanza, it may be seen as an expression of regret or of satisfaction. However, there is significance in the difference between what the speaker has just said of the two roads, and what he will say in the future. According to Lawrance Thompson, Frost's biographer, as Frost was once about to read the poem, he commented to his audience, "You have to be careful of that one; it's a tricky poem—very tricky," perhaps intending to suggest the poem's ironic possibilities.

Thompson suggests that the poem's narrator is "one who habitually wastes energy in regretting any choice made: belatedly but wistfully he sighs over the attractive alternative rejected." Thompson also says that when introducing the poem in readings, Frost would say that the speaker was based on his friend Edward Thomas. In Frost's words, Thomas was "a person who, whichever road he went, would be sorry he didn't go the other. He was hard on himself that way."

References

External links

 3 audio readings of The Road Not Taken
 Critical essays on "The Road Not Taken"

1915 poems
1900s poems
Poetry by Robert Frost
American poems
Modernist poems
Works originally published in American magazines
Works originally published in literary magazines